Mere Jeevan Saathi (Hindi for My Life Partner) is the title of two Hindi films

Mere Jeevan Saathi (1972 film), starring Rajesh Khanna
Mere Jeevan Saathi (2006 film), starring Akshay Kumar

See also
Jeevan Saathi, an Indian television series
Jeevan Sathi, a 1962 Ollywood / Oriya film directed by Prabhat Mukherjee